The 2010 Rallye de France was the first running of the Rallye de France–Alsace and the eleventh round of the 2010 World Rally Championship season. The rally took place over 1–3 October 2010, and was based in Strasbourg, the capital of the Alsace region. The rally was also the eighth round of the Production World Rally Championship, the ninth round of the Super 2000 World Rally Championship and the fifth round of the Junior World Rally Championship.

Sébastien Loeb became champion for the seventh successive season by claiming his 60th WRC win on the streets of his birthplace, Haguenau. Dani Sordo was second and Petter Solberg was third. Thanks to Sordo's second place, Citroën also retained its manufacturers champion title on this same event.

Introduction
Prior to the rally, depending on results, Sébastien Loeb had the chance to clinch his seventh consecutive world title with two events to spare. With a 43-point lead over Sébastien Ogier pre-rally, Loeb had to outscore Ogier by eight points. If Loeb scored more than six points on the event, it would eliminate Ford's Jari-Matti Latvala from championship contention. As it turned out, Loeb won the event which gave him the title.

Results

Event standings

Special stages

Standings after the rally

Drivers' Championship standings

Manufacturers' Championship standings

References

External links 

 The official website of the World Rally Championship
 Results at eWRC.com

France
Rallye de France Alsace
Rally